Nellysford is a census-designated place (CDP) in Nelson County, Virginia, United States. The population as of the 2010 Census was 1,076. It is home to the Wintergreen golf course at Stoney Creek. Its zip code is 22958.

Elk Hill and the Wintergreen Country Store are listed on the National Register of Historic Places.

References

Census-designated places in Nelson County, Virginia